"Loosey's Rap" is a 1988 song written and recorded by Rick James with a rap performed by Roxanne Shanté.  The single was one of the last of Rick James' releases to make the Hot Black Singles chart, and was his first number one on the Black Singles chart since 1983. "Loosey's Rap" was also the last of four number ones on the Black Singles chart, staying at the top spot for one week.  The single did not make the Hot 100, but peaked at number twenty-five on the dance charts.

References

1988 singles
Rick James songs
1988 songs
Songs written by Rick James
Song recordings produced by Rick James